Camillo Gualandi (died 11 February 1609) was a Roman Catholic prelate who served as Bishop of Cesena (1588–1609).

Biography
On 30 March 1588, Camillo Gualandi was appointed during the papacy of Pope Sixtus V as Bishop of Cesena. On 25 April 1588, he was consecrated bishop by Giulio Antonio Santorio, Cardinal-Priest of San Bartolomeo all'Isola, with Agapito Bellomo, Bishop of Caserta, and Pietro Ridolfi (bishop), Bishop of Venosa, serving as co-consecrators. He served as Bishop of Cesena until his death on 11 February 1609.

His uncle was Odoardo Gualandi.

References

External links and additional sources
 (for Chronology of Bishops) 
 (for Chronology of Bishops) 

16th-century Italian Roman Catholic bishops
17th-century Italian Roman Catholic bishops
Bishops appointed by Pope Sixtus V
1609 deaths